The National Union Convention (also known as the Loyalist Convention, the Southern Loyalist Convention, the National Loyalists' Loyal Union Convention, or the Arm-In-Arm Convention) was held on August 14, 15, and 16 1866, in Philadelphia, Pennsylvania.

Convention
The convention was called in Philadelphia before of the midyear elections of 1866 in an attempt to encourage political support for US President Andrew Johnson, who was under attack by both moderate and Radical Republicans. Johnson's friends tried to rally support for his lenient pro-South Reconstruction policies. Some hoped to create a new political party, but that goal was not realized.

Delegates gathered at a hastily-built temporary structure that was designed to accommodate the several thousand people expected to attend. Formally called "the Wigwam," the immense edifice was on Girard Avenue, between 19th and 20th Streets, across from Philadelphia's Girard College.

About 7000 prominent politicians and activists attended the convention. At its opening, representatives from Massachusetts (General Darius Nash Couch) and South Carolina (Governor James Lawrence Orr) paraded arm-in-arm to symbolize national reconciliation and social equity. The convention was called to order by US Postmaster General Alexander Randall. General (and former New York Governor and Senator) John Adams Dix served as the temporary chairman and Wisconsin Senator James R. Doolittle served as permanent convention president.

In the end, the convention was not successful in unifying the country behind Johnson. He launched a speaking tour (known as the "Swing Around the Circle") hoping to regain public and political support. On the speaking tour, Johnson at times attacked his Republican opponents with crude and abusive language and on several occasions appeared to have had too much to drink. Ultimately, the tour was a disaster for Johnson and emboldened Congress to override him and to impeach him in 1868.

Notable attendees
Notable attendees of the National Union Convention include:
Augustus C. Baldwin, U.S. Representative from Michigan
John Minor Botts, U.S. Representative from Virginia
Augustus Brandegee, U.S. Representative from Connecticut
Ralph P. Buckland, U.S. Representative from Ohio
Darius Couch, U.S. Army General
John Covode, U.S. Representative from Pennsylvania
Edgar Cowan, U.S. Senator from Pennsylvania
James A. Cravens, U.S. Representative from Indiana
William Earl Dodge, U.S. Representative from New York
James Rood Doolittle, U.S. Senator from Wisconsin
William McKee Dunn, U.S. Representative from Indiana
Joseph Barton Elam, U.S. Representative from Louisiana
George Briggs, U.S. Representative from New York
James Edward English, U.S. Representative and U.S. Senator from Connecticut
Nathan A. Farwell, U.S. Senator from Maine
Thomas W. Ferry, U.S. Representative and U.S. Senator from Michigan
Horace Greeley, publisher and U.S. Representative from New York
William S. Groesbeck, state legislator from Ohio
Andrew Jackson Hamilton, U.S. Representative from Texas
Aaron Harding, U.S. Representative from Kentucky
James K. Holland, state legislator from Texas
Samuel Hooper, U.S. Representative from Massachusetts
George S. Houston, U.S. Representative from Alabama
Reverdy Johnson, U.S. Senator from Maryland
James Harlan, U.S. Senator from Iowa
Jacob Merritt Howard, U.S. Senator from Michigan
William Lawrence, U.S. Representative from Ohio
John Wesley Longyear, U.S. Representative from Michigan
John L.N. Stratton, U.S. Representative from New Jersey
Samuel S. Marshall, U.S. Representative from Illinois
Horace Maynard, U.S. Representative from Tennessee
Robert Mallory, U.S. Representative from Kentucky
Thomas Amos Rogers Nelson, U.S. Representative from Tennessee
Richard Oglesby, Governor of Illinois
James Lawrence Orr, Governor of South Carolina
Halbert E. Paine, U.S. Representative from Wisconsin 
George Hunt Pendleton, U.S. Senator from Ohio
Cyrus L. Pershing, jurist and later candidate for Governor of Pennsylvania
Thomas G. Pratt, Governor and U.S. Senator from Maryland
Henry Jarvis Raymond, U.S. Representative from New York
James S. Rollins, U.S. Representative from Missouri
Robert Cumming Schenck, U.S. Representative from Ohio
James Speed, U.S. Attorney General
John Dodson Stiles, U.S. Representative from Pennsylvania
Byron Gray Stout, U.S. Representative from Michigan
William Barrett Washburn, U.S. Representative from Massachusetts
Peter Godwin Van Winkle, U.S. Senator from West Virginia
Fernando Wood, copperhead Mayor of New York City
Clement Vallandigham, copperhead from Ohio. He was elected to the convention but withdrew to avoid disturbing the harmony of the convention.

Further reading
 McKitrick, Eric. Andrew Johnson and Reconstruction (1960) pp 394–420
 Thomas Wagstaff.  "The Arm-in-Arm Convention," Civil War History 1968 14(2): 101-119
The proceedings of the National union convention, held at Philadelphia, August 14, 1866 at Internet Archive. primary sources

See also
National Union Party (United States)
1864 National Union National Convention

References

External links
Address to President, by Hon. Reverdy Johnson, Aug. 18, 1866, communicating proceedings National Union Convention entered into the record of Johnson's impeachment trial.
Cartoon mocking the convention by Thomas Nast, originally published in Harper's Weekly,  September 29, 1866

Reconstruction Era
1866 in American politics
1866 in Pennsylvania
Political conventions in Philadelphia
1866 conferences
August 1866 events